Calliostoma depictum is a species of sea snail, a marine gastropod mollusk in the family Calliostomatidae.

Description
The size of the shell varies between 6 mm and 11 mm.

Distribution
This species occurs in the Atlantic Ocean off Eastern Brazil.

References

External links
 To Biodiversity Heritage Library (5 publications)
 To Encyclopedia of Life
 To USNM Invertebrate Zoology Mollusca Collection
 To World Register of Marine Species
 

depictum
Gastropods described in 1927